The Anastasievsko-Troitskoye field is a Russian oil field that was discovered in 1994 and located on the continental shelf of the Black Sea. It began production in 1995 and produces oil and natural gas.

References

Black Sea energy
Oil fields of Russia